Tu-130 was a concept for a boost-glider launched by an intercontinental three-stage missile  by Soviet designer Tupolev.

Development history 
From 1957, work began on the creation of a drone unmanned airliner "DP" (Dal'niy Planer - long-range glider or Dal'niy Passazheerskiy – long-range passenger aircraft) in Tupolev Design Bureau. It was the last stage of a strategic rocket. It was supposed to use medium-range ballistic missiles ( R-5, R-12 ) as carriers. In addition, the option of using a proprietary booster was considered.

The launch vehicle would raise the DP to an altitude of 80–100 km, after which it would be separated from the carrier and transferred to the flight planner. Then the trajectory was corrected. The target could be at a distance of 4,000 km, and the speed of the DP reached Mach 10. The trajectory was corrected by aerodynamic control surfaces . The power plant on board was missing. Chemical power sources and compressed air cylinders were used to power on-board equipment . For cooling equipment and thermonuclear charge was used onboard cooling system. The airframe design did not provide for a cooling system, so all the stresses that should have arisen during the flight should have been taken into account in the design. At the final stage of the flight, the device was transferred to a dive at the target and, according to the signal from the altimeter, the warhead was undermined.

The advantage of this design to the first generation of strategic missiles was higher accuracy with a simpler targeting system and the provision of a complex flight path to the target, which made it difficult for the anti - aircraft and anti - aircraft defense systems to operate.

For the implementation of the project, two years of intensive work were carried out, new materials and technologies were developed, the problems of aerodynamics were investigated, and field models were created and studied. Several experimental aircraft were built to test the main ideas. The project work program was named Tu-130.

Various aerodynamic schemes were investigated: symmetric, asymmetrical, tailless, duck and others. A series of models were built that were blown through the TsAGI wind tunnels, including at supersonic speeds. At the M. Gromov Flight Research Institute, tests were carried out on which models of DP with solid - fuel accelerators were dropped from the Tu-16 LL. Also shooting models with artillery guns and gas-dynamic guns. During the tests, speeds of up to 6 M were achieved.

In 1959, the design began DP. Aerodynamic configuration tailless was chosen. The wedge - shaped fuselage had a semi-elliptical cross section with a blunt bow. The low-lying triangular wing had a small area with a sweep along the leading edge of 75° and elevons throughout its span. Vertical plumage consisted of upper and lower carinae at the rear of the fuselage. On both halves of the keel were installed brake pads. The wing and controls had a wedge-shaped profile. Due to the aerodynamic heating of the nose of the apparatus and the leading edges of the bearing and steering surfaces were made of graphite. The glider was made of stainless steel.

A series of five experimental aircraft was laid. In 1960, the first aircraft was manufactured. However, with all the successes of the design bureau, the work was terminated by a Resolution of the Council of Ministers of the USSR . Already built airplanes were partly recycled, and partly transferred to the Vladimir Chelomey design bureau. The research and design materials developed during the work were used in the next work of the Tupolev design bureau - the Zvezda manned rocket plane .

Work on the project continued only about a year before it was abandoned in favor of the more conventional Tu-123 supersonic cruise missile.

References

Nuclear missiles of the Soviet Union
Tupolev aircraft
Hypersonic aircraft